Srinivas Mane is an Indian politician and Member of Legislative Assembly (MLA) representing Hangal (Vidhana Sabha constituency) in the Karnataka Legislative Assembly in India. He was elected on 2 November 2021.

He was also the Member of Legislative Council (MLC) representing Dharwad Local Authorities constituency in the Karnataka Legislative Council from 2010 to 2021
and the Vice president of Karnataka Pradesh Youth congress committee.

References

Indian National Congress politicians from Karnataka
Living people
Karnataka MLAs 2018–2023

People from Haveri district

1974 births